Magnus Bäcklund (12 December 1866 – 26 June 1903) was a Swedish missionary to Chinese Turkestan with the Mission Covenant Church of Sweden.

Magnus was born in Alstakan, Gunnarskog parish, Värmland. He grew up in a poor family and had to work hard. He found employment at Östlund & Almqvist in Arvika. He studied German, French, and Greek during this time.

In 1895 he travelled to Kashgar, but being delayed, he studied Uyghur in Bukhara, and only arrived in Kashgar June the following year, 1897. In Xinjiang, he worked at the Mission hospital.

On 26 June 1903 he died of typhoid, and was buried in Kashgar. He was 37 years old.

Bibliography
J. Lundahl (editor), På obanade stigar: Tjugofem år i Ost-Turkestan. Stockholm, Svenska Missionsförbundet Förlag, 1917
E. John Larsson, Magnus Bäcklund: ett Guds sändebud i Centralasien, Kristinehamn: Värmland, 1914.

Notes

External links
Mission and Change in Eastern Turkestan (English Translation of select chapters of Mission och revolution i Centralasien)

Swedish Protestant missionaries
Protestant missionaries in China
Christian missionaries in Central Asia
1866 births
1903 deaths
Deaths from typhoid fever
Swedish expatriates in China
 infectious disease deaths in China